Clifford A. McNulty (born December 25, 1930) was a member of the Florida House of Representatives representing the 73rd district from 1967 to 1970.

He was the son of Chester McNulty and Jennie May Larson Limmer McNulty.
He was an alternate delegate to Republican National Convention from Florida, in 1960, and 1964.

References 

1931 births
People from Melbourne, Florida
Republican Party members of the Florida House of Representatives
Living people
20th-century American politicians
University of Florida alumni